Chinese Portuguese or Portuguese Chinese may refer to

Macanese language, a Portuguese-based creole originating from Macau
Macanese cuisine, the cuisine of Macau, with influences from southern Chinese and Portuguese cuisines
Macanese people, people of mixed Chinese and Portuguese descent in Macau
Eurasian (mixed ancestry) people of Chinese and Portuguese descent in other countries
People with dual citizenship of China and Portugal

See also
Chinese people in Portugal